Clydes Island is an island in south-eastern Australia. It is part of the Tasman Island Group, lying close to the south-eastern coast of Tasmania around the Tasman Peninsula, and is easily accessible from mainland Tasmania.

References

Notes

Sources
 Brothers, Nigel; Pemberton, David; Pryor, Helen; & Halley, Vanessa. (2001). Tasmania’s Offshore Islands: seabirds and other natural features. Tasmanian Museum and Art Gallery: Hobart. 

Islands of Tasmania